Vincent Thiébaut (born 23 May 1972) is a French politician of La République En Marche! (LREM) who has been serving as a member of the French National Assembly since the 2017 elections, representing the department of Bas-Rhin.

Political career
In parliament, Thiébaut serves on the Committee on Sustainable Development and Spatial Planning. In addition to his committee assignments, he is part of the French parliamentary friendship groups with Andorra, Belarus and Cameroon. 

In July 2019, Thiébaut voted in favour of the French ratification of the European Union’s Comprehensive Economic and Trade Agreement (CETA) with Canada.

See also
 2017 French legislative election

References

1972 births
Living people
Deputies of the 15th National Assembly of the French Fifth Republic
La République En Marche! politicians
Place of birth missing (living people)
Members of Parliament for Bas-Rhin